Apookta Creek is a stream in the U.S. state of Mississippi. It is a tributary to the Big Black River.

Apookta is a name derived from the Choctaw language meaning "doubled". Variant names are "Apuchtah Creek" and "Opookta Creek".

References

Rivers of Mississippi
Rivers of Attala County, Mississippi
Mississippi placenames of Native American origin